The 1989 Tri Tournament (also known as 1989 DBU 100 years or DBU Centenary Tournament) was a minor international men's football tournament organised by Danish Football Association to celebrate its 100th anniversary. It was held in Copenhagen from 14 to 18 June 1989.

Participant teams 
The following teams participated in the tournament.

 Denmark
 Sweden
 Brazil

Matches

Match rules 

 90 minutes.
 Penalty shoot-out after a draw in 90 minutes.
 Maximum of three substitutions.

Matches 
Denmark beat Sweden 6–0 in the opening game on 14 June 1989. Two days later, Sweden beat Brazil 2–1 after goals by Roger Ljung and Stefan Rehn. On 18 June 1989, Denmark beat Brazil 4–0 to win the tournament.

Winners

Goalscorers 

 3 goals

  Michael Laudrup

 2 goals

  Lars Elstrup

 1 goal

  Roger Ljung
  Stefan Rehn
  Flemming Povlsen
  Henrik Andersen
  Jan Bartram
  Morten Olsen
  Lars Olsen
  Cristóvão Borges

References

1989 in Danish football
June 1989 sports events in Europe
Sports competitions in Copenhagen
1980s in Copenhagen